The Royal Green Jackets (RGJ) was an infantry regiment of the British Army, one of two "large regiments" within the Light Division (the other being The Light Infantry).

History
The Royal Green Jackets was formed on 1 January 1966 by the amalgamation of the three separate regiments of the Green Jackets Brigade: 
1st Green Jackets (43rd and 52nd)
2nd Green Jackets, the King's Royal Rifle Corps
3rd Green Jackets, the Rifle Brigade (Prince Consort's Own).

There were also two Territorial Army battalions made up as follows:
 4th (V) Battalion, Royal Green Jackets – formed from the remnants of the Rangers (KRRC), London Rifle Brigade, Tower Hamlets Rifles, Queen's Westminsters, Queen Victoria's Rifles, Queen's Royal Rifles and Civil Service Rifles.
 5th (V) Battalion, Royal Green Jackets – formed from the 4th Battalion, Oxfordshire and Buckinghamshire Light Infantry (TA) and the Buckinghamshire Battalion, Oxfordshire and Buckinghamshire Light Infantry.

During the 1970s, 1980s and onwards up until the end of “The Troubles”, the battalions were deployed to various parts of Northern Ireland (Operation Banner). The 1st, 2nd and 3rd battalions were also based in West Germany, Osnabrück (1RGJ), Minden (2RGJ) and Celle (3RGJ).

The regiment's greatest loss of life came on 20 July 1982 when seven RGJ bandsmen were killed by a Provisional Irish Republican Army bomb which exploded during a public concert featuring the music from Oliver! to 120 people at the bandstand in Regents Park.

In 1992, 1/RGJ was disbanded and 2/RGJ and 3/RGJ renumbered 1/RGJ and 2/RGJ respectively.

After the 1992 reorganisation, the unit was mostly based overseas in Dhekelia (Cyprus) and Paderborn (Germany), as well as in Northern Ireland. It also saw action in Bosnia and Kosovo during the Yugoslav Wars. Both battalions returned to the United Kingdom by 2002 and in 2003 the 1st Battalion served on Operation Telic 2 in Iraq.

On 24 November 2005, the Ministry of Defence announced that the regiment would be amalgamated with The Light Infantry, the Devonshire and Dorset Light Infantry and the Royal Gloucestershire, Berkshire and Wiltshire Light Infantry to form a single large regiment to be called The Rifles. The reorganisation into The Rifles took effect on 1 February 2007 with the 1st Battalion Royal Green Jackets becoming the 2nd Battalion, The Rifles and the 2nd Battalion Royal Green Jackets becoming 4th Battalion, The Rifles. The 1st Battalion The Royal Green Jackets' final operational tour was in Basra, in Iraq, on Operation Telic in 2006-07.

Regimental museum
The Royal Green Jackets (Rifles) Museum is based at Peninsula Barracks in Winchester.

Traditions
Their motto was Celer et Audax (Latin: "Swift and Bold"). As they were used as shock troops and marksmen, they had to get to the front line of battle as fast as was possible; as a result the RGJ marched at 140 paces per minute (at a 30" pace) whereas other regiments march at just 120.

The regiment was classed as a 'rifle' regiment, having its lineage in the regiments of foot that were equipped with the first Baker rifles. Traditionally, rifle regiments wore rifle green tunics, an early form of camouflage, instead of the red jackets worn by line infantry, hence the regimental name.

The cap badge was a Maltese Cross, which was drawn from the badges of the King's Royal Rifle Corps and The Rifle Brigade, with a combination of some of their battle honours on its arms.

Battle honours

The battle honours are:
Louisburg, Quebec 1759, Martinique 1762, Havannah, North America 1763–64, Mysore, Hindoostan, Martinique 1794, Copenhagen, Montevideo, RoLica, Vimiero, Corunna, Martinique 1809, Talavera, Busaco, Barrosa, Fuentes d'Onor, Albuhera, Ciudad Rodrigo, Badajoz, Salamanca, Vitoria, Pyrenees, Nivelle, Nive, Orthez, Toulouse, Peninsula, Waterloo, South Africa 1846–47, Mooltan, Goojerat, Punjab, South Africa 1851–53, Alma, lnkerman, Sevastopol, Delhi 1857, Lucknow, Taku Forts, Pekin 1860, New Zealand, Ashantee 1873–74, Au Masjid, South Africa 1879, Ahmad Khel, Kandahar 1880, Afghanistan 1878–80, Tel-el-Kebir, Egypt 1882–84, Burma 1885–87, Chitral, Khartoum, Defence of Ladysmith, Relief of Kimberley, Paardeberg, Relief of Ladysmith, South Africa 1899–1902.
The Great War: Mons, Le Cateau, Retreat from Mons, Marne 1914, Aisne 1914, 18, Armentières 1914, Ypres 1914, 15, 17, 18, Langemarck 1914, 17, Gheluvelt, Nonne Boschen, Givenchy 1914, Neuve Chapelle, Gravenstafel, St. Julien, Frezenberg, Heliewaarde, Aubers, Festubert 1915, Hooge 1915, Loos, Mount Sorrel, Somme 1916, 18, Albert 1916, 18, Bazentin, Delville Wood, Pozières, Guillemont, Flers-Courcelette, Morval, Le Transloy, Ancre Heights, Ancre 1916, 18, Bapaume 1917, 18, Arras 1917, 18, Vimy 1917, Scarpe 1917, 18, Arleux, Messines 1917, 18, Pilckem, Menin Road, Polygon Wood, Broodseinde, Poelcappelle, Passchendaele, Cambrai 1917, 18, St. Quentin, Rosières, Avre, Villers-Bretonneux, Lys, Hazebrouck, Bailleul, Kemmel, Bethune, Drocourt Quéant, Hindenburg Line, Havrincourt, Epehy, Canal du Nord, St. Quentin Canal, Beaurevoir, Kortrijk, Selle, Valenciennes, Sambre, France and Flanders 1914–18, Piave, Vittorio Veneto, Italy 1917–18, Doiran 1917, 18, Macedonia 1915–18, Kut al Amara 1915, Ctesiphon, Defence of Kut al Amara, Tigris 1916, Khan Baghdadi, Mesopotamia 1914–18.
Archangel 1919
The Second World War: Defence of Escaut, Siege of Calais, Cassel, Ypres-Comines Canal, Normandy Landing, Pegasus Bridge, Villers-Bocage, Odon, Caen, Esquay, Bourguebus Ridge, Mont Pincon, Le Perier Ridge, Falaise, Antwerp, Hechtel, Nederrijn, Lower Maas, Roer, Ourthe, Rhineland, Reichswald, Kleve, Goch, Hochwald, Rhine, Ibbenbueren, Dreirwalde, Leese, Aller, North-West Europe 1940, 44–45, Egyptian Frontier 1940, Sidi Barrani, Beda Fomm, Mersa el Brega, Agedabia, Derna Aerodrome, Tobruk 1941, Sidi Rezegh 1941, Chor es Sufan, Saunnu, Gazala, Bir Hacheim, Knightsbridge, Defence of Alamein Line, Ruweisat, Fuka Airfield, Alam el Halfa, El Alamein, Capture of Haifaya Pass, Nofilia, Tebaga Gap, Enfidaville, Medjez el Bab, Kasserine, Thala, Fondouk, Fondouk Pass, El Kourzia, Djebel Kournine, Agroub el Megas, Tunis, Hamman Lif, North Africa 1940-43, Sangro, Salerno, Santa Lucia, Salerno Hills, Cardito, Teano, Monte Camino, Garigliano Crossing, Damiano, Anzio, Cassino II, Liri Valley, Melfa Crossing, Monte Rotondo, Capture of Perugia, Monte Malbe, Arezzo, Advance to Florence, Gothic Line, Coriano, Gemmano Ridge, Lamone Crossing, Orsara, Tossignano, Argenta Gap, Fossa Cembalina, Italy 1943-45, Veve, Greece 1941, 44,45, Crete, Middle East 1941, Arakan Beaches, Tamandu, Burma 1943-44.

Alliances
 - Melbourne University Regiment
 - Sydney University Regiment
 - The British Columbia Regiment (Duke of Connaught's Own)
 - Princess Patricia's Canadian Light Infantry
 - The Queen's Own Rifles of Canada (1966–2007)
 - The Brockville Rifles
 - The Royal Winnipeg Rifles
 - The Royal Regina Rifles
 - 1st Battalion, The Royal New Zealand Infantry Regiment
 - The Hauraki Regiment
 - The Durban Light Infantry
 - The Kaffrarian Rifles
 - Sri Lanka Sinha Regiment
 - 1st Battalion, The Ghana Regiment
 -

See also
Bermuda Volunteer Rifle Corps
Pegasus Bridge
7 RGJ Bandsmen killed by IRA in 1982 Regent's Park Bombing
Royal Green Jackets (Rifles) Museum

References

Sources

Further reading

External links
 Royal Green Jackets Association
 RGJ Museum

Infantry regiments of the British Army
Rifle regiments of the British Army
Rifle regiments
The Rifles
British light infantry
Military units and formations disestablished in 2007
Military units and formations established in 1966